The New Zealand dotterel (Charadrius obscurus) is a species of shorebird found only in certain areas of New Zealand.

The southern subspecies of the New Zealand plover is considered critically endangered and was nearing extinction with about 75 individuals remaining in 1990. Conservation measures increased this to 250 by 2005, but a further decline has occurred since 2012 to an estimated 60–80 mature individuals in 2017.

Taxonomy and systematics 
The New Zealand dotterel was formally described in 1789 by the German naturalist Johann Friedrich Gmelin in his revised and expanded edition of Carl Linnaeus's Systema Naturae. He placed it with the plovers in the genus Charadrius and coined the binomial name Charadrius obscurus. Gmelin's description was based on the "Dusky plover" that had been described in 1785 by the English ornithologist John Latham in his A General Synopsis of Birds. The species had been collected in April 1773 on James Cook's second voyage to the South Pacific at Dusky Sound, South Island, New Zealand. The specific epithet obscurus is Latin meaning "dark" or "dusky".

A 2015 study determined that its closest relatives are two other New Zealand plovers, the wrybill, which was found to be in the Charadrius clade, and the double-banded plover.

Two subspecies are recognised, although a taxonomic review has supported recognition of tentative species status for each of the two populations and this was recognised in the Handbook of the Birds of the World (BirdLife, 2014) and in the conservation listing of the IUCN.

 C. o. aquilonius - Dowding, 1994: Found on the North Island (New Zealand)
 C. o. obscurus - Gmelin, JF, 1789: Found on the South Island and Stewart Island (New Zealand)

Distribution and habitat 
New Zealand dotterels are usually found in two disjunct populations in New Zealand, usually on sandy beaches and sand spits or feeding in tidal estuaries.
The northern population occurs on the North Island and the southern population occurs at the southern end of the South Island and on Stewart Island/Rakiura.

Behaviour and ecology

Breeding 
Parents lay eggs in the spring and summer. They nest on beaches above the high tide mark, and the nest is just a shallow hole dug in the ground. Parents typically lay 2-3 eggs and are replaced if lost. The chicks hatch about 28 days after the eggs have been laid. Because the nests are on the ground, the chicks can walk the day they hatch. They are cared for by their parents but have to find their own food as the adults do not feed them. Parents will often go to great lengths to protect their chicks, as sometimes the parent will pretend to be injured to let the chicks escape, or usher chicks into grass or holes when threatened. They can usually fly within 6–8 weeks

Diet 
Dotterels feed on small sand hoppers and insects, however they will sometimes feed on small aquatic creatures like small fish and crabs.

Status
The IUCN, which treats the two subspecies as separate species, rates the northern subspecies as Near Threatened and the southern subspecies as Critically Endangered.

The population size of the southerly subspecies had been reduced to about 62 individual birds in 1990 and the first study of the population structure undertaken from 1988 to 1992 indicated their significant decline. Conservation measures were put in place involving the poisoning of feral cats and rats and the population has gradually risen, with about 250 individuals being recorded in 2005. The northerly subspecies has a wider range and its population was about 1300 in 1989. It had recovered to about 1700 individuals by 2004 but only as a result of intensive management. Nesting on beaches, they are vulnerable to disturbance by people and their dogs. Since 2012, there has been a rapid decline in numbers in the southern population, with an estimated 60 to 80 mature individuals in 2017.

The northern subspecies has the conservation status of "Regionally Critical" in the Wellington Region.

In the Hawke's Bay region, the species was locally extinct from the late 19th century.  However, in 1990 some birds were seen at the Mahia Peninsula.  Coastliine surveys conducted in 2011 and 2021 found that numbers in the region had more than doubled over the ten year period, with 222 birds counted in 2021.

Gallery

References

Further reading

External links 

 New Zealand dotterel/tūturiwhatu Department of Conservation
 

Charadrius
Endemic birds of New Zealand
Birds described in 1789
Taxa named by Johann Friedrich Gmelin